Lammas School is a coeducational secondary school and sixth form located in Leyton area of the London Borough of Waltham Forest, England.

Previously a community school administered by Waltham Forest London Borough Council, in December 2018 Lammas School converted to academy status. The school is now sponsored by The Griffin Schools Trust.

References

External links
 

Secondary schools in the London Borough of Waltham Forest
Academies in the London Borough of Waltham Forest
Leyton